Jordan Tai (born 21 March 1982) is a New Zealand welterweight kickboxer and a middleweight boxer. He is a two time K-1 MAX New Zealand champion who competed in World Elite of K-1 MAX and a New Zealand Boxing Champion.

Titles
 2016 New Zealand National Boxing Federation Champion
 2006 SuperLeague Elimination Champion -73 kg
 2003 K-1 MAX New Zealand Champion
 2002 K-1 MAX New Zealand Champion
 2000 WKBF South Pacific Super Lightweight Champion
 2000 Featherweight Golden Gloves
 2000 Lightweight Golden Gloves

Professional boxing record

| style="text-align:center;" colspan="8"|10 Wins (9 knockouts, 1 decisions), 3 Losses (2 knockouts, 0 decisions), 0 Draws
|-  style="text-align:center; background:#e3e3e3;"
|  style="border-style:none none solid solid; "|Res.
|  style="border-style:none none solid solid; "|Record
|  style="border-style:none none solid solid; "|Opponent
|  style="border-style:none none solid solid; "|Type
|  style="border-style:none none solid solid; "|Rd., Time
|  style="border-style:none none solid solid; "|Date
|  style="border-style:none none solid solid; "|Location
|  style="border-style:none none solid solid; "|Notes
|- align=center
|Lose
|10–3
|align=left| Mose Auimatagi Jnr
|
|
|
|align=left|
|align=left|
|- align=center
|Win
|10–2
|align=left| Edwin Samy
|
|
|
|align=left|
|align=left|
|- align=center
|Win
|9–2
|align=left| Jame Uoka
|
|
|
|align=left|
|align=left|
|- align=center
|Lose
|8–2
|align=left| Jonathan Taylor
|
|
|
|align=left|
|align=left|
|- align=center
|Win
|8–1
|align=left| Joe Blackbourn
|
|
|
|align=left|
|align=left|
|- align=center
|Loss
|7–1
|align=left| David Toussaint
|
|
|
|align=left|
|align=left|
|- align=center
|Win
|7–0
|align=left| Sam Loli
|
|
|
|align=left|
|align=left|
|- align=center
|Win
|6–0
|align=left| Tony Iapesa
|
|
|
|align=left|
|align=left|
|- align=center
|Win
|5–0
|align=left| Mose Auimatagi Jnr
|
|
|
|align=left|
|align=left|
|- align=center
|Win
|4–0
|align=left| Panuve Helu
|
|
|
|align=left|
|align=left|
|- align=center
|Win
|3–0
|align=left| Sivan Hermez
|
|
|
|align=left|
|align=left|
|- align=center
|Win
|2–0
|align=left| Ben Vili
|
|
|
|align=left|
|align=left|
|- align=center
|Win
|1–0
|align=left| Corey Burton
|
|
|
|align=left|
|align=left|

Kickboxing record 

{{Kickboxing record start|norec=y|title=Kickboxing Record|record=57 Wins (28 (T)KO's), 20 Losses, 5 Draws}}
|-
|- align="center"  bgcolor="#fbb"
| 2017-11-18|| Loss||align=left| Islam Murtazaev|| EM Legend 25 || Zunyi, China || Decision|| 3 || 3:00
|-  bgcolor="#FFBBB"
| 2012-10-20 || Loss ||align=left| Yi Long || Wu Lin Feng || He'nan, China ||  Decision (Unanimous)
| 3 || 3:00  
|-
|-  bgcolor="#FFBBBB"
| 2012-06-24|| Loss ||align=left| John Wayne Parr || Boonchu Cup: Caged Muay Thai || Australia || KO (Uppercut) || 4 || 2:11
|-
|-  bgcolor="#CCFFCC"
| 2012-04-28 || Win ||align=left| Vasilis Kakarikos || Power Promotions - The Showdown|| Melbourne, Australia || KO || 4 || 2:30  
|-
|-  bgcolor="#FFBBB"
| 2011-09-24 || Loss ||align=left| Zhou Zhipeng || Wu Lin Feng || Kuala Lumpur, Malaysia || Decision (Unanimous) || 3 || 3:00  
|-
|-  bgcolor="#FFBBB"
| 2011-08-05 || Loss ||align=left| Wes Capper || SUPERFIGHT PROMOTION|| Perth, Australia || Decision || 5 || 3:00  
|-
|-  bgcolor="#CCFFCC"
| 2011-07-23 || Win ||align=left| Kai Chee || Phillip Lam Promotions - NZ vs Malaysia|| Auckland, New Zealand || TKO || 1 || 2:30  
|-
|-  bgcolor="#FFBBB"
| 2011-06-11 || Loss ||align=left| Zhou Zhipeng || Wu Lin Feng || He'nan, China || Decision (Unanimous) || 3+1 || 3:00  
|-
|-  bgcolor="#FFBBB"
| 2011-04-02 || Loss ||align=left| Steve Moxon || Kings of Kombat 3|| Keysborough, Australia || Majority Decision || 3 || 3:00  
|-
|-  bgcolor="#c5d2ea"
| 2010-08-29 || Draw ||align=left| Steve Moxon || Kings of Combat 2010 || Keysborough, Australia || Decision Draw || 3 || 3:00
|-
|-  bgcolor="#FFBBBB"
| 2008-05-31 || Loss ||align=left| Dzhabar Askerov || K-1 Scandinavia MAX 2008, Quarter Finals || Stockholm, Sweden || TKO (Referee Stoppage, Eye Injury) || 2 || 0:41
|-
|-  bgcolor="#FFBBBB"
| 2008-04-09 || Loss ||align=left| Artur Kyshenko || K-1 World MAX 2008 Final 16 || Hiroshima, Japan || Ext.R Decision (Unanimous) || 4 || 3:00
|-
! style=background:white colspan=9 |
|-
|-  bgcolor="#FFBBBB"
| 2007-03-25 || Loss ||align=left| Daniel Dawson || K-1 World MAX 2007 World Elite Showcase || Yokohama, Japan || Decision (Unanimous) || 3 || 3:00
|-
|-  bgcolor="#FFBBBB"
| 2007-03-25 || Loss ||align=left| Marfio Canoletti || Ichigeki Bulgaria || Varna, Bulgaria || Decision (Unanimous) || 5 || 3:00
|-
|-  bgcolor="#FFBBBB"
| 2006-11-03 || Loss ||align=left| Hiroki Shishido || Shoot Boxing World Tournament 2006, Quarter Finals || Tokyo, Japan || Ext.R Decision (Unanimous) || 4 || 3:00
|-
|-  bgcolor="#CCFFCC"
| 2006-09-04 || Win ||align=left| Tsogto Amara || K-1 World MAX 2006 Champions Challenge || Tokyo, Japan || Decision (Unanimous) || 3 || 3:00
|-
|-  bgcolor="#CCFFCC"
| 2006-03-11 || Win ||align=left| José Reis || SuperLeague Elimination 2006, Final || Vienna, Austria || Decision (Unanimous) || 3 || 3:00
|-
! style=background:white colspan=9 |
|-
|-  bgcolor="#CCFFCC"
| 2006-03-11 || Win ||align=left| Petr Polak || SuperLeague Elimination 2006, Semi Finals || Vienna, Austria || KO (Punches) || 2 ||
|-
|-  bgcolor="#CCFFCC"
| 2006-03-11 || Win ||align=left| Michal Hansgut || SuperLeague Elimination 2006, Reserve Fight || Vienna, Austria || KO (High Kick) || 2 ||
|-
|-  bgcolor="#CCFFCC"
| 2006-03-11 || Win ||align=left| Amir Zeyada || SuperLeague Apocalypse 2006 || Paris, France || TKO (Ref Stop/Punches) || 2 ||
|-
|-  bgcolor="#FFBBBB"
| 2006-01-28 || Loss ||align=left| Peter Crooke || SuperLeague Hungary 2006 || Budapest, Hungary || Decision || 3 || 3:00
|-
|-  bgcolor="#CCFFCC"
| 2005-05-21 || Win ||align=left| José Reis || SuperLeague Germany 2005 || Oberhausen, Germany || KO (Right High Kick) || 2 || 
|-
|-  bgcolor="#CCFFCC"
| 2005-04-30 || Win ||align=left| Ben Burton || K-1 Battle of Anzacs II || Auckland, New Zealand || Decision || 3 || 3:00
|-
|-  bgcolor="#CCFFCC"
| 2005-04-14 || Win ||align=left| Jean-Charles Skarbowsky || Phillip Lam Muay Thai Promotion  || Auckland, New Zealand || TKO (Referee Stoppage) || 1 || 
|-
|-  bgcolor="#CCFFCC"
| 2004-11-05 || Win ||align=left| Hamid Boujaoub || K-1 Oceania MAX 2004, Semi Finals || Auckland, New Zealand || Decision || 3 || 3:00
|-
! style=background:white colspan=9 |
|-
|-  bgcolor="#CCFFCC"
| 2004-11-05 || Win ||align=left| Charles August || K-1 Oceania MAX 2004, Quarter Finals || Auckland, New Zealand || Decision || 3 || 3:00
|-
|-  bgcolor="#FFBBBB"
| 2004-04-07 || Loss ||align=left| Buakaw Por. Pramuk || K-1 World MAX 2004 World Tournament Open || Tokyo, Japan || Decision (Unanimous) || 3 || 3:00
|-
! style=background:white colspan=9 |
|-
|-  bgcolor="#CCFFCC"
| 2004-06-16 || Win ||align=left| Jenk Behic || Kings of Oceania 2004 || Auckland, New Zealand || Decision || 3 || 3:00
|-
|-  bgcolor="#CCFFCC"
| 2004-04-23 || Win ||align=left| Steve Douet || K-1 Battle of Anzacs 2004 || Auckland, New Zealand || KO || 1 || 
|-
|-  bgcolor="#CCFFCC"
| 2003-11-07 || Win ||align=left| Shane Chapman || K-1 New Zealand 2003, Final || Auckland, New Zealand || Decision (Split) || 3 || 3:00
|-
! style=background:white colspan=9 |
|-
|-  bgcolor="#CCFFCC"
| 2003-11-07 || Win ||align=left| Dwayne Glasgow || K-1 New Zealand 2003, Semi Finals || Auckland, New Zealand || KO || 1 ||
|-
|-  bgcolor="#CCFFCC"
| 2003-11-07 || Win ||align=left| David Gahan || K-1 New Zealand 2003, Quarter Finals || Auckland, New Zealand || KO (Right Punch + Knee) || 2 || 2:10
|-
|-  bgcolor="#FFBBBB"
| 2003-09-12 || Loss ||align=left| Ante Bilić || K-1 Final Fight - Croatia vs New Zealand || Split, Croatia || Decision (Unanimous) || 5 || 3:00
|-
|-  bgcolor="#c5d2ea"
| 2003-04-11 || Draw ||align=left| Ante Bilić || K-1 Lord of the Rings || Auckland, New Zealand || Decision Draw || 5 || 3:00
|-
|-  bgcolor="#CCFFCC"
| 2002-11-08 || Win ||align=left| Aaron Boyes || K-1 New Zealand 2002, Final || Auckland, New Zealand || KO || ||
|-
! style=background:white colspan=9 |
|-
|-  bgcolor="#CCFFCC"
| 2002-11-08 || Win ||align=left| Nick Misich || K-1 New Zealand 2002, Semi Finals || Auckland, New Zealand || KO || ||
|-
|-  bgcolor="#CCFFCC"
| 2000-10-22 || Win ||align=left| Kristian Storek || K-1 New South Wales 2000 || Sydney, Australia || Decision || 5 || 2:00
|-
! style=background:white colspan=9 |
|-
|2000-02-03
|Win
|Alan Kilpatrick 
|Auckland, New Zealand
|
|
|
|
|
|-
|-
| colspan=9 | Legend:    

Awards and recognitions
2019 Gladrap Boxing Awards Returning Boxer of the year (Nominated)'''

See also 
K-1
List of K-1 events
List of male kickboxers

References

1982 births
Living people
New Zealand male kickboxers
Welterweight kickboxers
New Zealand Muay Thai practitioners
Sportspeople from Auckland
New Zealand professional boxing champions
New Zealand male boxers
Boxers from Auckland